Brunei and China established formal diplomatic relations in 1991. Brunei has an embassy in Beijing, and China has an embassy in Bandar Seri Begawan.

History 

Direct contact between China and Brunei began as early as the 10th century. The claim is evidenced by the archaeological findings of Chinese artefacts at Kampong Limau Manis, Brunei Darussalam. With more than 50,000 ceramic shards dating between the 10th-14th centuries-old having been collected from the Limau Manis site, the discovery proves the indisputable fact that China-Brunei relations have existed for a long time

In modern times relations are not close since Brunei was a British protectorate, beginning in the 19th century until it gained official independence on 1 January 1984. During this time, there were also various concerns in Brunei particularly toward communism and its sensitivities to the ethnic Chinese population. By 30 September 1991, Brunei had become the last member of ASEAN to establish official diplomatic relations with China.

In 2019, Chinese leader and CCP general secretary Xi Jinping Xi Jinping visited Brunei. An opinion letter published by the national newspaper, Borneo Bulletin, hailed it as an "exceptional moment" in Brunei–China relations. Finally, China's relations with Brunei would serve to help the country economically. The establishment of Hengyi Petrochemical Complex, the setting up of StarCity Brunei, and other investments into the economy would help to diversify the rentier state further. However, China's growing influence is seen with suspicion by other external powers, such as the US.

But Brunei is confident that it sees China as a strong and dependable economic ally and vice versa.

Economic relations
 In 2011, trade between the two countries has increased to U$1.3 billion. The two countries promote practical co-operation in some areas such as infrastructure construction, agriculture and fishery. Some Chinese companies also have agreed to finance two projects in aquaculture and paddy production in Brunei which worth about U$10 million.

The Brunei-Guangxi Economic Corridor was established in 2014, into which approximately US$500 million has been promised. China is the largest foreign investor in Brunei, with investments estimated at US$4.1 billion.

The Chinese Ambassador to Brunei, Yang Hian, described Brunei as an important part of the Belt and Road Initiative. China and Brunei operate Brunei's largest port, Muara Container Terminal, as a joint venture between China's Guangxi Beibu Gulf Port Group and Darussalam Assets Sdn Bhd.

According to Chatham House fellow Bill Hayton, China is pressuring Brunei to allow it more access to Brunei's exclusive economic zone.

See also 
 Ethnic Chinese in Brunei
 Bruneian Ambassador to China

Further reading 
 BRIGHT FUTURE FOR BRUNEI-CHINA TIES BruDirect
 Brunei, China hail special relationship The Borneo Post

References 

 
China
Bilateral relations of China